{{Infobox ethnic group
| group = Cameroonians in France
| pop = ''10,000| popplace = París, Marseille
| langs = Fanji, Jagham, Basaa, Medumba, French
| rels = Christianity(majority), Islam(minority)
| native_name = 
| native_name_lang = 
}}Cameroonians in France''' consist of migrants from Cameroon and their descendants living and working in France.

History
The first Cameroonian immigrants in France came in the 1970s, like the Congolese, some years after the first immigrant wave from Sub-Saharan Africa (Senegal Valley) to France.
This immigration has sped up in the 1980s (due to the social and economic crisis in Cameroon)

Notable people
 Samuel Umtiti, professional footballer
 Françoise Mbango Etone, track and field athlete                       
 Kylian Mbappé, professional footballer
 Griedge Mbock Bathy, professional footballer
 Gévrise Émane, judoka
 Véronique Mang, track and field athlete
 Bryan Mbeumo, professional footballer
 Loïc Mbe Soh , professional footballer 
 Francis Ngannou, mixed martial artist
 Dany Bill, kickboxer
 Teddy Tamgho, track and field athlete
 Calixthe Beyala, writer
 Emil Abossolo-Mbo, actor
 Vencelas Dabaya, weightlifter
 Serge Betsen, rugby union player
 Hassan N'Dam N'Jikam, professional boxer
 Antoinette Nana Djimou, heptathlete, pentathlete
 Cedric Doumbe, kickboxer
 Carlos Takam, professional boxer
 Gaëlle Nayo-Ketchanke, weightlifter
Benoît Assou-Ekotto, professional footballer
 Adolphe Teikeu, professional footballer
 Zacharie Noah, former professional footballer
 Yannick Noah, singer and tennis player
 Joakim Noah, basketball player
 William Saliba

References

African diaspora in France
Society of France
French people of Cameroonian descent
Ethnic groups in France
Immigration to France by country of origin